Len Prince is an American photographer whose work includes celebrity portraiture, fashion, nudes, still life, a flower series and cityscapes. Since 2001–2013, his work has increasingly focussed on his collaboration with Jessie Mann which is itself about the act of collaboration, while creating memorable images that combine theatrics, and performance, and ideas. Len's focus on theatrical and entertainment photography has led to campaign work on The NYC Broadway shows ... The Graduate with Kathleen Turner, Jason Biggs, and Alicia Silverstone. And "Chicago with Gretchen Mol, Brooke Shields, Mel B, and several others. " I love photography and mostly the work with Artist's different Characters".”The Art Of Creation is far more fun and rewarding than exhibitions and ego".

Early life
Len Prince was born in 1953 in Detroit Michigan. He first became interested in photography at the age of 9, and studied at the School of Visual Arts. Len also tried many different ways of photographic styles, many of which were still lives or nudes of his friends.

Exhibitions
Masks & Identity: Len Prince in the Collection of William K. Zewadski, Florida Museum of Photographic Arts, June 12 – August 2, 2008
Jessie Mann "Self Possessed" Photographs by Len Prince, Danziger Projects, New York, Sep 9 – October 14, 2006; Adamson Gallery, Washington, DC, Jan 13 – February 24, 2007
Prince/Paulson Glam Pop Rock, Mercury Art Works, Athens, GA, Sep 9 – November 4, 2006

References

External links
Artist’s Homepage
Florida Museum of Photographic Arts Catalog Essay by Joanne Milani
The Artistic Life: Jessie Again (the New Yorker, Nov. 6 2006)
Ode to Photo History: Len Prince puts the photo icon Jessie Mann back on center stage.

Stuart A. Rose Manuscript, Archives, and Rare Book Library, Emory University: Len Prince papers, 1969-2016

American photographers
Living people
Year of birth missing (living people)